Prof Peter Macnair FRSE FGS (1868–1929) was a Scottish naturalist and geologist. He was Curator of the Kelvingrove Art Gallery and Museum. He was President of the Geological Society of Glasgow.

Life
He was born in Glasgow on 12 September 1868 into a family with a draper’s business, J & M Macnair, but his family moved to Perthshire in his childhood and he was educated at Kinnoull Primary School, then Perth Academy. He was then apprenticed as a draper in the family firm in 1882. He spent much free time studying geology at the Perth Museum.

In 1886 he went to work in Killin. In 1889 he returned to Perth. His mother by this time is shown as a widow, Mrs James Macnair, seamstress, living at 14 Watergate in Perth. Peter is presumed to have lived with her as he is not listed independently in directories. In 1890 he moved to Glasgow living at 1 Morris Place with other family members,  to help to run J & M Macnair. He then joined the Glasgow Geological Society.

In 1889 his geological interests led to him being created Curator of the People's Palace on Glasgow Green. He was then asked to assist in the scientific exhibits in the Glasgow International Exhibition (1901). In 1902 he was created Curator of the Museum section of Kelvingrove Art Gallery and Museum. Concurrently he was made Professor of Zoology at Anderson College Medical School. At this stage he lived at 20 Martyr Street in Glasgow.

In 1907 he was elected a Fellow of the Royal Society of Edinburgh. His proposers were John Walter Gregory, John Horne, Malcolm Laurie and Ben Peach.

In later life he lived at 39 Gardner Street in Partick.
He died in Glasgow on 29 March 1929.

Family

In 1894 he married Rebecca MacKenzie.
Their three sons, Peter, Duncan and Ian all served in the First World War. Ian Macnair died in 1918 serving in the Royal Flying Corps. Peter Macnair became Professor of Metallurgy at Swansea University. Their daughter Helen Macnair gained an MA in Geology and Palaeontology ay Glasgow University  in 1920.

Publications

The Geology and Scenery of the Grampians and the Valley of the Strathmore (1908) 2 vols. (See Grampian Mountains and Strathmore, Angus.)
A Guide to the Mineral Collection of the Kelvingrove Museum (1910)
Cambridge County Geography: Perthshire (1912)
Cambridge County Geography: Argyll and Bute (1914)
Cambridge University Press: 'Perthshire' Pocket Edition (1914)

References

1868 births
1929 deaths
Scientists from Glasgow
Fellows of the Royal Society of Edinburgh
Scottish geologists
Scottish non-fiction writers